Austrocidaria anguligera is a species of moth in the family Geometridae. It is endemic to New Zealand. It is regarded as being uncommon but is frequently confused with Austrocidaria bipartita.

Taxonomy
This species was first described by Arthur Gardiner Butler in 1879 using specimens collected by Frederick Hutton in Dunedin and given the name Phibalapteryx anguligera. George Vernon Hudson discussed and illustrated this species in his 1898 book as a synonym of Hydriomena gobiata. In his 1928 publication The Butterflies and Moths of New Zealand Hudson again illustrated and discussed the species, but under the name Eucymatoge anguligera following Edward Meyrick's placement of the species within that genus. In 1988 John S. Dugdale assigned the species to a new genus Austrocidaria. The holotype specimen is held at the Natural History Museum, London.

Description
Butler described the adult moths of the species as follows:

A. anguligera is sometimes confused with A. bipartita, with the latter being the more common species.

Distribution
This species is endemic to New Zealand. It has been found in Canterbury, Otago, Invercargill, and Otira in the South Island, as well as in Auckland and Wellington in the North Island.

Biology and behaviour
The adults of this species are on the wing from September to March. They can be found resting on tree trunks or fence posts during the day.

Habitat and host species
This species prefers scrubby forest habitat. It occurs in a variety of ecosystems from montane to coastal. The larvae of this moth feeds on Coprosma species. Meyrick noted that the adults of this species could be found on the flowers of Senecio species. Hudson stated that the adult moths fed on the flowers of Veronica salicifolia.

References

External links

 Image of holotype specimen

Xanthorhoini
Moths of New Zealand
Moths described in 1879
Endemic fauna of New Zealand
Endangered biota of New Zealand
Taxa named by Arthur Gardiner Butler
Endemic moths of New Zealand